Valley Fair Mall may refer to:
Valley Fair Mall (West Valley City, Utah)
Valley Fair Shopping Center, in Appleton, Wisconsin
Westfield Valley Fair, overlaying parts of both the California cities of San Jose and Santa Clara